Pol-e-Choobi Synagogue or Talmood Torah is a synagogue located near the Sepah Square in Tehran, Iran.

See also 
 Talmud Torah

External links
 Official website
 Photos

References

Synagogues in Tehran